Darkroom: A Memoir in Black and White is an autobiographical comic set during the Civil Rights Movement written by American author Lila Quintero Weaver. It was published on 31 March 2012. The graphic novel explores issues of immigrant identity that was based on the author's life.

Overview 
In 1961, Lila immigrates with her family from Buenos Aires to live in Marion, Alabama. The comic book describes her experience growing up as a Latina immigrant during the integration period immediately following the outlawing of Jim Crow laws in the Southern United States. She describes her feelings about growing up in a town with racial tension that she didn't know where exactly she belonged and about her personal fight against the racial discrimination surrounding her. She also writes her personal account of the night of the Jimmie Lee Jackson murder which took place near her home. The graphic novel analyzes the connections between race, identity, immigration, and growing up in the United States.    

The author was nominated for the 2012 Ignatz Award for Promising New Talent for this work.

See also 
 Civil rights movement in popular culture
 American Born Chinese
 The Four Immigrants Manga
 The Arab of the Future

References 
 

Autobiographical comics

American graphic novels

2012 graphic novels
Novels set in Alabama
Autobiographical graphic novels
Non-fiction graphic novels
Novels set in the 1960s
Marion, Alabama